The Historic Track is a half-mile (900 m) harness racing track in Goshen, New York. It was opened in 1838 and has been in operation ever since, the oldest continuously operated horse racing track in North America.

Informal horse races had been held along neighboring Main Street (now part of NY 207) since the 1750s. The current track site was first used in 1838 when a ⅓-mile (530 m) circle around a circus ground near the south end of the track was cleared and prepared for regular racing. Later it would be succeeded by an oval track perpendicular to the current one, then a long square track around the whole site, until the current track was built in 1873.

Regular events were held at the track until the late 1970s, when the parimutuel machines were taken out. Today the track operates a limited but intense season every summer on Sundays in June, followed by a series of races between June 30 and July 4. 

The track was designated as a National Historic Landmark in 1966 and was added to the National Register of Historic Places later in the same year, when the National Register was created. The grandstands seat 2200 fans. In 1980 it was identified as a contributing property to the Church Park Historic District. The Harness Racing Museum & Hall of Fame (run by a separate organization) is located nearby.

Goshen Central High School holds its annual graduation ceremony at the track, enabling a large audience of townspeople. 

In 2017 a fire, possibly started in the blacksmith's shop, destroyed some of the barns and stables on the property. The horses housed in them were saved; the blaze did not affect the grandstand or any of the other buildings on the property.

See also

List of horse racing venues
List of National Historic Landmarks in New York
National Register of Historic Places listings in Orange County, New York

References

External links

 Official website

National Historic Landmarks in New York (state)
Horse racing venues in New York (state)
Harness racing venues in the United States
National Register of Historic Places in Orange County, New York
Tourist attractions in Orange County, New York
Sports venues completed in 1838
Goshen, New York
1838 establishments in New York (state)
Individually listed contributing properties to historic districts on the National Register in New York (state)
Sports venues on the National Register of Historic Places in New York (state)
Sports venues in Orange County, New York